Sydney David Einfeld  (17 June 1909 – 16 June 1995) was an Australian politician and Jewish community leader. Einfeld is credited with changing Australia's immigration policy to provide a refuge for Holocaust survivors. As a result, Australia accepted more refugees per capita than any other country in the world, and more Jewish refugees than anywhere except Israel.

Early and personal life
He was born in Sydney in 1909, three weeks after his parents arrived in Australia – hence his name, Sydney. He was the son of Rabbi Marcus Einfeld (1874-1937) who came to Australia in 1909 (becoming the chazan and the Second Minister of the Great Synagogue) by way of London, England, which he had immigrated to from Jarosław in Galicia, with his wife Deborah (Gabel) Einfeld (d. 1957).

He married  Billie (Rosa) Appelboom on 2 June 1934 in the Great Synagogue, whereupon they lived in Newcastle, New South Wales, and had one son, Marcus, and a daughter, Robyn. 
His son Marcus Einfeld, a former Superior Court Judge of the Federal Court of Australia and the Supreme Courts of New South Wales, Western Australia, and the Australian Capital Territory, was jailed for perjury and perverting the course of justice in relation to a speeding ticket.

He was educated at Fort Street Boys High School before becoming a manager of a merchandising company. For many years until the time of his death, Einfeld also served as the patron of the local rugby league club, the Sydney Roosters, then known as the Eastern Suburbs District Rugby League Football Club.

Political life

Einfeld is the man credited with changing Australia's immigration policy after World War II to provide a refuge for Holocaust survivors. As a result, Australia accepted more refugees per capita than any other country in the world, and more Jewish refugees than anywhere except Israel. In 1948, Einfeld was elected to the Board of the Australian Jewish Welfare Society. In 1952 he was elected President of the Australian Jewish Welfare and Relief Societies. He held the position for 25 years. He was also President of the Executive Council of Australian Jewry between 1953–54, 1957–58, and 1961–62.

In 1961, he was elected to the Australian House of Representatives as the Labor member for Phillip, defeating Liberal MP William Aston. At the time, he was only the fourth Jew to be elected to the Commonwealth Parliament. He was defeated by Aston in 1963. The Australian Council for International Development, an independent national association of Australian non-government organisations working in the field of international aid and development, was founded in 1965 with Einfeld as Chairman.

In 1965 he was elected to the New South Wales Legislative Assembly for the seat of Bondi at a by-election. In 1966 he became Deputy Leader of the Opposition. In 1971 he transferred from Bondi to the seat of Waverley. He was New South Wales Minister for Consumer Affairs in the Wran Government from 1976 to 1984, when he retired from politics. In 1982 he was made an Officer of the Order of Australia.

Einfeld died in 1995, at 85 years of age. A major bypass road in Bondi Junction is named Syd Einfeld Drive.

References

 

Australian Labor Party members of the Parliament of Australia
Jewish Australian politicians
Members of the Australian House of Representatives for Phillip
Members of the Australian House of Representatives
Members of the New South Wales Legislative Assembly
1909 births
1995 deaths
People from Newcastle, New South Wales
Australian Labor Party members of the Parliament of New South Wales
20th-century Australian politicians
Officers of the Order of Australia